Juarez or Juarez and Maximilian (Spanish: Juárez y Maximiliano) is a 1934 Mexican historical drama film directed by Miguel Contreras Torres and Raphael J. Sevilla. The film is set during the French intervention in Mexico during the 1860s, and features the battle between Maximilian I of Mexico and Benito Juárez.

The theme is based on the 1925 play called Juarez and Maximilian by Franz Werfel. The theme is used again in the later 1939 American film Juarez. It was one of the few major commercial successes for the Mexican film industry in the early sound era, before the beginning of the Golden Age of Mexican cinema.

It was one of the most expensive Mexican films made at that time.

Cast
 Medea de Novara as Carlota
 Enrique Herrera as Maximilian
 Alfredo del Diestro as Marshall Bazaine
 Antonio R. Frausto as Porfirio Díaz
 Froylan B. Tenes as Benito Juárez
 Matilde Palou as Princess of Salm-Salm
 Julio Villarreal as Captain Pierron
 Carlos Orellana as Doctor Basch
 María Luisa Zea as Jardinera
 Mario Martínez Casado as José Luis Blasio
 Manuel Tamés as Grill
 Ramón Peón as Tudos
 Luis G. Barreiro as Professor Billibeck
 Abraham Galán as Colonel Miguel López
 Fernando Nava Ferriz as General Mariano Escobedo
 Alberto Miquel as Count Thun
 Godofredo del Castillo as Archbishop Labastida y Dávalos
 Roberto E. Guzmán as General Miguel Miramón
 Jesús Melgarejo as General Vicente Riva Palacio
 Ángel T. Sala as General Corona
 J. Enríquez as General Tomás Mejía
 Victorio Blanco as General Leonardo Márquez
 Alberto Galán as Hersfeld
 A. Sáenz as Count Bombelles

References

Bibliography
 Elena, Alberto & López, Marina Díaz. The Cinema of Latin America. Wallflower Press, 2003

External links
 

1934 films
1934 drama films
1930s historical drama films
Mexican black-and-white films
Mexican historical drama films
1930s Spanish-language films
Cultural depictions of Benito Juárez
Films directed by Miguel Contreras Torres
Films set in the 1860s
Films set in Mexico City
Second French intervention in Mexico films
Cultural depictions of Maximilian I of Mexico
1930s Mexican films